In molecular biology mir-370 microRNA is a short RNA molecule. MicroRNAs function to regulate the expression levels of other genes by several mechanisms. This microRNA, mir-370-3p, has been shown to play a role in heart failure. The upregulation of mir-370-3p in the sinus node leads to downregulation of the pacemaker ion channel, HCN4, and thus downregulation of the corresponding ionic current, which causes sinus bradycardia.

See also 
 MicroRNA

References

Further reading

External links 
 

MicroRNA
MicroRNA precursor families